The New Sidewalk is the second studio album by American punk rock band Such Gold. It was released in November 2014 under Razor & Tie.

Track listing

References

2014 albums
Such Gold albums
Razor & Tie albums